Agrupación Cultural y Deportiva Ciudad de Cáceres was a Spanish football team based in Cáceres, in the autonomous community of Extremadura. Founded in 2005, they hosted their home games at Campo de Fútbol Pinilla.

Before 2011–12 season, Ciudad de Cáceres merged with CD Diocesano, being latter the seat's owner in Regional Preferente.

Season to season

4 seasons in Regional Preferente
2 seasons in Primera Regional

References

External links
Regional Preferente 2010–11

Sport in Cáceres, Spain
Association football clubs established in 2005
Association football clubs disestablished in 2011
Divisiones Regionales de Fútbol clubs
Defunct football clubs in Extremadura
2005 establishments in Spain
2011 disestablishments in Spain